Hairer is a surname. Notable people with the surname include:

Ernst Hairer (born 1949), Austrian mathematician
Martin Hairer (born 1975), Austrian mathematician